Law Forward is an American non-profit legal advocacy organization based in Madison, Wisconsin. Jeff Mandell and Doug Poland founded Law Forward in October 2020. Poland was notable for his role as a lead trial attorney in Gill v. Whitford, a major 2018 U.S. Supreme Court case involving the constitutionality of partisan gerrymandering.

Law Forward is currently headquartered in Madison, Wisconsin.

History 
Law Forward was founded by Jeff Mandell, who serves as its Leader Counsel and Board President, as well as Doug Poland, who serves as its Litigation Director.

In 2021, Law Forward requested Milwaukee County District Attorney John T. Chisholm to launch an investigation on Republicans who had sent fraudulent electoral college certifications for Donald Trump during the 2020 U.S. Presidential elections.

In January 2022, Law Forward also appealed a judge's order barring Wisconsin ballot drop boxes for the February 15 election. Another one of Law Forward's ongoing cases in 2022 seeks to reinstate voters.

Issues 
Law Forward specializes in diverse issues, including voter suppression, election interference, gerrymandering, and minority voting rights. It also focuses on politics in Wisconsin politics, including state-level elections and voting issues. It is also a non-partisan strategic litigation firm according to Mandell.

People 
The Legal Advisory Council at Law Forward includes former legislators, politicians, and judges.

 Hon. Russ Feingold, Former United States Senator from Wisconsin, President of the American Constitution Society, Honorary Co-Chair
 Hon. Barbara Lawton, Former Lieutenant Governor of Wisconsin, Honorary Co-Chair
 Hon. Paul Higginbotham, Former Judge for the Wisconsin Court of Appeals
 Ian Bassin, Executive Director of Protect Democracy

Staff attorneys include Mel Barnes, who has written reports with Norm Eisen, Norman Ornstein, Jeff Mandell, and others.

Media 
Mandell has been interviewed in various media outlets, including the Rachel Maddow Show on MSNBC, The Washington Post, and others.

References 

Politics of Wisconsin
Electoral reform groups in the United States
Political advocacy groups in the United States